Noah Baumbach is an American writer, director, and filmmaker. He's known for his films The Squid and the Whale (2005), Frances Ha (2013), and Marriage Story. He is also known with his collaborations with Wes Anderson on the films The Life Aquatic with Steve Zissou (2004), ''Fantastic Mr. Fox' (2009).

Awards and nominations

Academy Awards

British Academy Film Awards

Golden Globe Awards

Critics awards

Critics' Choice Movie Awards

Festival awards

Cannes Film Festival

Venice Film Festival

Industry awards

Independent Spirit Awards

Writers Guild Awards

Critical reception

References 

Baumbach, Noah
Baumbach, Noah